Cinctura is a genus of sea snails, marine gastropod mollusks in the family Fasciolariidae, the spindle snails, the tulip snails and their allies. Species in this genus were previously grouped in the genus Fasciolaria.

Species
Species within the genus Cinctura include:
 Cinctura branhamae (Rehder & Abbott, 1951)
 Cinctura hunteria (Perry, 1811)
 Cinctura lilium (Fischer von Waldheim, 1807)

References

 Snyder M.A., Vermeij G.J. & Lyons W.G. (2012) The genera and biogeography of Fasciolariinae (Gastropoda, Neogastropoda, Fasciolariidae). Basteria 76(1-3): 31-70

Fasciolariidae